Into Paradise were an Irish indie rock group from Dublin, Ireland, whose influences included Joy Division and Echo & the Bunnymen. They formed in 1986 as Backwards into Paradise, and released their debut EP, Blue Light, in 1989 on the independent record label, Setanta. Soon after came the EP Change, and the band's first album, Under the Water. The lead singer and guitarist of the band was David Long (born in 1963), who had the nickname of "Longer".

Their most successful album and major record label debut, was the Adrian Borland-produced Churchtown.

Members
David Long (vocals, guitar)
Rachael Tighe (bass)
James Eadie (guitar, keyboards, vocals)
Ronan Clarke (drums)

Discography

Albums
Under the Water (1990)
Churchtown (1991)

Compilations
Into Paradise (1990 US only compilation)

Singles and EPs
Blue Light (EP) (1989)
Change (EP) (1990)
"Burns My Skin" (1991)
"Angel" (1991)
"Down All the Days" (1992)
"Angelus" (1992)
"For No One" (1993)

References

Irish alternative rock groups
Irish indie rock groups
Musical groups established in 1986
Musical groups disestablished in 1993
Musical groups from Dublin (city)
1986 establishments in Ireland
People from Churchtown, Dublin
Setanta Records artists